In Chinese mythology, Longmen ( The Dragon Gate) is located at the top of a waterfall cascading from a legendary mountain. The legend states that while many carp swim upstream against the river's strong current, few are capable or brave enough for the final leap over the waterfall. If a carp successfully makes the jump, it is transformed into a powerful dragon. The legend is so famous that throughout China, a common saying is that "a student facing his examinations is like a carp attempting to leap the Dragon Gate."

Legends

According to tradition, a carp that could swim upstream and then leap the falls of the Yellow River at Dragon Gate (Longmen) would be transformed into a dragon. This motif symbolizes success in the civil service examinations. The Dragon Gate is located at the border of Shanxi and Shaanxi where the Yellow River flows through a cleft in the Longmen mountains, supposedly made by Yu the Great, who cut through the mountain.

According to one account, forceful water brought many carp down the river, and the carp could not swim back. The carp complained to Yu the Great. His wife, the Jade Emperor's daughter, explained to her father on behalf of the carp. The Jade Emperor promised that if those carp could leap over the Dragon Gate, then they would become mighty dragons. Thus, all the carp competed at a yearly competition to leap the Longmen falls; those who succeeded were immediately transformed into dragons and flew off into the sky.

Pictures of carp attempting to leap the Longmen falls have been enduringly popular in China and other parts of Asia. There are other Dragon Gates (Longmen) in China's rivers, typically with steep narrows, and the mythological geography does not depend upon an actual location. Many other waterfalls in China also have the name Dragon Gate and much the same is said about them. Other famous Dragon Gates are on the Wei River where it passes through the Lung Sheu Mountains and at Tsin in Shanxi Province. The "flying carp" or "silver carp" (Hypophthalmichthys molitrix) is native to China and other parts of Asia.

Idiom
The fish's jumping feature is set in such a proverbial idiom as "Liyu (Carp) jumps over the Dragon Gate" (鲤跃龙门) an idiom that conveys a vivid image symbolizing a sudden uplifting in one's social status, as when one ascends into the upper society or has found favor with the royal or a noble family, perhaps through marriage, but in particular through success in the imperial examination. The idiom is often used to encourage students or children to achieve success through hard work and perseverance.

See also
 Koinobori
 Magikarp

References

Christie, Anthony (1968). Chinese Mythology. Feltham: Hamlyn Publishing. .
Eberhard, Wolfram (2003 [1986 (German version 1983)]), A Dictionary of Chinese Symbols: Hidden Symbols in Chinese Life and Thought. London, New York: Routledge. 
Parsons, Glenn & Stell, Ehlana & Hoover, Jan. (2016). Estimating Burst Swim Speeds and Jumping Characteristics of Silver Carp (Hypophthalmichthys molitrix) Using Video Analyses and Principles of Projectile Physics. ERDC/TN ANSRP-16-2. Retrieved 29 October 2018.
Yang, Lihui, et al. (2005). Handbook of Chinese Mythology. New York: Oxford University Press. 

Locations in Chinese mythology
Mythological mountains
Asia in mythology